Golbaghi (also Romanized as Golbāghī) is a village in Sharvineh Rural District, Kalashi District, Javanrud County, Kermanshah Province, Iran. At the 2006 census, its population was 147, in 33 families.

References 

Populated places in Javanrud County